Smythwick  may refer to:

William Smythwick, MP for Grampound
Smythwick, subdivision of Canton, Georgia